Isaac Leffler (November 7, 1788March 8, 1866), sometimes spelled Lefler or Loeffler, was an American lawyer and Iowa pioneer who represented Virginia's 18th congressional district in the United States House of Representatives for one term in the 1820s. He also served in the legislatures of the Commonwealth of Virginia, as well as the Wisconsin and Iowa Territories. His younger brother, Shepherd Leffler, became one of Iowa's first congressmen after achieving statehood.

Early life and education
Born on his grandfather's plantation, "Sylvia's Plain," in Washington County, Pennsylvania, near Wheeling, Virginia (now West Virginia), Leffler attended the public schools and was graduated from Jefferson College, (now Washington & Jefferson College), in Canonsburg, Pennsylvania.

Virginia career
After studying law, he was admitted to the bar and commenced practice in Wheeling. He served as a member of the Virginia House of Delegates for six terms, serving in the 1817–1819 sessions, the 1823–1824 session, the 1825–1827 sessions, and the 1832–1833 session.  He also served as a member of the Virginia Board of Public Works in 1827.

In 1826, Leffler was elected as an Adams Party candidate to the Twentieth Congress, defeating incumbent Jacksonian Joseph Johnson. When running for re-election in 1828, he was beaten (along with President John Quincy Adams). Although Andrew Jackson defeated Adams, Leffler was defeated by Anti-Jacksonian Party candidate Philip Doddridge. Leffler's term in the U.S. House lasted from March 4, 1827, to March 3, 1829.

Iowa career
In 1835, Leffler moved to the area that is now Burlington, Des Moines County, Iowa—then part of the Michigan Territory. At the time, Iowa and the other regions of the Michigan Territory west of the Mississippi River were broadly divided between Des Moines County in the south and Dubuque County in the north.

Leffler was admitted to the Des Moines County bar on April 15, 1835, and practiced law. While under Michigan's regional governance, he was named as the chief justice of the first judicial tribunal of Des Moines County on April 11, 1836. After the creation of Wisconsin Territory on April 20, 1836, he served in the first legislature of the new Territory from 1836 through 1838, and served as Speaker of the House during the 2nd session of the Assembly, in the winter of 1837–38.

After Iowa Territory was created from areas of Wisconsin Territory west of the Mississippi River—previously referred to as the Iowa District—in 1838, he served as a member of the Iowa Territory house of representatives in 1841.

President John Tyler appointed Leffler as United States marshal for the district of Iowa on December 18, 1843. He served until removed by President James K. Polk on December 29, 1845, when he resumed the practice of law in Burlington. He declined the appointment of the register of the land office at Stillwater (in what was then Minnesota Territory) in 1849. He was appointed by President Millard Fillmore as receiver of public sums of money for the Chariton land district of Iowa on August 30, 1852, and served on that position until removed by President Franklin Pierce on March 29, 1853.

He died in Chariton, Iowa, on March 8, 1866, at age 77. He was interred in Aspen Grove Cemetery, in Burlington.

References

External links
 
 

1788 births
1866 deaths
Iowa lawyers
Michigan Territory officials
Members of the Iowa Territorial Legislature
Members of the Wisconsin Territorial Legislature
Members of the Virginia House of Delegates
Politicians from Wheeling, West Virginia
Virginia lawyers
Washington & Jefferson College alumni
United States Marshals
Wisconsin lawyers
National Republican Party members of the United States House of Representatives from Virginia
Politicians from Burlington, Iowa
19th-century American politicians
19th-century American lawyers
Lawyers from Wheeling, West Virginia